The Office of the Comptroller of the Currency (OCC) is an independent bureau within the United States Department of the Treasury that was established by the National Currency Act of 1863 and serves to charter, regulate, and supervise all national banks and thrift institutions and the federally licensed branches and agencies of foreign banks in the United States. The acting Comptroller of the Currency is Michael J. Hsu, who took office on May 10, 2021.

Duties and functions

Headquartered in Washington, D.C., it has four district offices located in New York City, Chicago, Dallas and Denver. It has an additional 92 operating locations throughout the United States. It is an independent bureau of the United States Department of the Treasury and is headed by the Comptroller of the Currency, appointed to a five-year term by the President with the consent of the U.S. Senate.

The OCC pursues a number of main objectives:

 to ensure the safety and soundness of the national banking system;
 to foster competition by allowing banks to offer new products and services;
 to improve the efficiency and effectiveness of OCC supervision especially to reduce the regulatory burden;
 to ensure fair and equal access to financial services to all Americans;
 to enforce anti-money laundering and anti-terrorism financing laws that apply to national banks and federally licensed branches and agencies of international banks; and
 to investigate misconduct committed by institution-affiliated parties of national banks, including officers, directors, employees, agents and independent contractors (including appraisers, attorneys and accountants).

The OCC participates in interagency activities in order to maintain the integrity of the federal banking system. By monitoring capital, asset quality, management, earnings, liquidity, sensitivity to market risk, information technology, consumer compliance, and community reinvestment, the OCC is able to determine whether or not the bank is operating safely and soundly, providing fair access and treatment to customers, and complying with all applicable laws and regulations. The OCC was created by Abraham Lincoln to fund the American Civil War but was later transformed into a regulatory agency to instill confidence in the federal banking system, ensure it operates in a safe and sound manner, and treats customers fairly.

The OCC regulates and supervises about 1,200 national banks, federally-licensed savings associations, and federally-licensed branches of foreign banks in the United States, accounting for more than two-thirds of the total assets of all U.S. commercial banks (as of September 30, 2020).

Other financial regulatory agencies like the OCC include the Federal Deposit Insurance Corporation (of which the Comptroller serves as a director), the Federal Reserve, the Consumer Financial Protection Bureau, and the National Credit Union Administration.  The OCC routinely interacts and cooperates with other government agencies, including the Consumer Financial Protection Bureau, Financial Crimes Enforcement Network, the Office of Foreign Asset Control, the Federal Bureau of Investigation, the U.S. Department of Justice, and the Department of Homeland Security.

The Comptroller serves as a director of the Neighborhood Reinvestment Corporation, and the Federal Deposit Insurance Corporation and member of the Financial Stability Oversight Council and the Federal Financial Institutions Examination Council.

Preemption of state banking regulation
In 2003, the OCC proposed regulations to preempt virtually all state banking and financial services laws for national banks and their diverse range of non-bank, corporate operating subsidiaries. Despite opposition from the National Conference of State Legislatures, the OCC's regulations went into effect. In Watters v.

State regulators cannot interfere with the business of banking by subjecting national banks or their OCC-licensed operating subsidiaries to multiple audits and surveillance under rival oversight regimes.

In Cuomo v.

HelpWithMyBank.gov
In July 2007, the OCC launched HelpWithMyBank.gov to assist customers of national banks and provide answers to national banking questions.

Financial inclusion
On July 10, 2020, the OCC announced the launch of Project REACh. REACh stands for Roundtable for Economic Access and Change, and the project brings together leaders from the banking industry, national civil rights organizations, business, and technology to reduce specific barriers that prevent full, equal, and fair participation in the nation's economy.

History 
During the American Civil War, leaders of the U.S. federal government, including President Abraham Lincoln and Treasury Secretary Salmon P. Chase, drafted plans for a national banking system. These plans were put into action by the National Currency Act of 1863, subsequently amended by the National Bank Act, which created the Office of the Comptroller of the Currency to administer the new system.

Under the law, banks could apply to the OCC for a charter issued by the federal government. Approved banks would purchase U.S. government bonds, generating cash flow for the government. The bonds would then be deposited with the U.S. Treasury to provide security to back the paper money to be issued by the banks, a new uniform United States currency that could be redeemed for gold or silver at banks around the country. By ensuring the new currency was backed by the government-held bonds, the system gave users greater confidence in the stability of the paper money.

In 1913, the Federal Reserve Act established a central bank, the Federal Reserve, to issue American currency. The OCC's role shifted to bank examination and regulation, though it retained "currency" as part of its name.

The OCC was involved in the response during and after the financial crisis of 2007–08, including work with the Troubled Asset Relief Program (TARP), designing stress tests for major banks, and collecting and analyzing data on home mortgage loans. The Dodd–Frank Wall Street Reform and Consumer Protection Act of 2010 abolished the Office of Thrift Supervision and merged its former oversight functions into the OCC. The law also reassigned much of the OCC's former compliance mandate to the new Consumer Financial Protection Bureau. It further established the Financial Stability Oversight Council, on which the Comptroller of the Currency sits.

Pronunciation 
As with other uses of the English word "comptroller" there is some ambiguity about the agency's pronunciation. Historically, the word was pronounced identically to "controller," though it is increasingly pronounced as it is spelled (that is, comp-troller). According to Marketplace, former acting Comptroller Keith Noreika and his successor, Joseph Otting, both used the latter pronunciation.

List of Comptrollers of the Currency

See also

 Bank regulation in the United States
 Title 12 of the Code of Federal Regulations
 Volcker Rule

References

External links

 OCC in the Federal Register

Comptrollers in the United States
Comptroller of the Currency
Financial regulatory authorities of the United States
Organizations based in Washington, D.C.
Government agencies established in 1863